On October 15, 1950, U.S. President Harry S. Truman and General Douglas MacArthur met on Wake Island to confer about the progress of the Korean War. Truman decided he would meet MacArthur at Wake Island, "so that General MacArthur would not have to be away from the troops in the field for long." The conference was to be the only time that Truman and MacArthur would ever meet face to face.

During the conference Truman presented MacArthur with his fifth and final Army Distinguished Service Medal.  MacArthur's record of being awarded the Army Distinguished Service Medal five times has been equaled only by Dwight D. Eisenhower.

Truman and MacArthur met privately at the conference and, therefore, there is no record of their conversation.  Although the antagonism between the two men is now well known, it is not known what effect, if any, the conference had on their relationship.

On October 30, 1950, MacArthur wrote to Truman:
"I left the Wake Island conference with a distinct sense of satisfaction that the country's interests had been well served through the better mutual understanding and exchange of views which it afforded. I hope it will result in building a strong defense against future efforts of those who seek for one reason or another (none of them worthy) to breach the understanding between us."

Despite the understanding achieved between Truman and MacArthur on Wake Island, their agreement would be short lived. They would quickly regress into disagreement with each other over policy in Korea, ultimately resulting in Truman's dismissal of MacArthur.

See also
President Truman's relief of General Douglas MacArthur

References

External links

Wake Island Meeting President Truman and General MacArthur from Truman Presidential Library 
Substance of Statements made at Wake Island Conference, dated 15 October 1950, compiled by General of the Army Omar N. Bradley, Chairman of the Joint Chiefs of Staff, from notes kept by the conferees from Washington. Papers of George M. Elsey.  
Personal memo of Harry S. Truman, November 25, 1950 on the Wake Island Conference 

1950 in the United States
Douglas MacArthur
Korean War
Presidency of Harry S. Truman
Wake Island
1950 conferences
October 1950 events in the United States